Stigmella diffasciae is a moth of the family Nepticulidae. It is found in California, United States.

The wingspan is 5.4-5.8 mm. There is probably one generation per year with larvae in March and adults in May.

The larvae feed on Ceanothus species. They mine the leaves of their host plant. The mine is long, narrow, linear and located on the upper surface of the leaf. The tract is contorted, turning several times in a small area. The frass is deposited evenly throughout the width of the mine.

External links
Nepticulidae of North America
A taxonomic revision of the North American species of Stigmella (Lepidoptera: Nepticulidae)

Nepticulidae
Moths of North America
Moths described in 1910